The 2021 CS Finlandia Trophy was held on October 7–10, 2021 in Espoo, Finland. It was part of the 2021–22 ISU Challenger Series. Medals were awarded in the disciplines of men's singles, women's singles, pairs, and ice dance.

After the previous Challenger Series event, the Nepela Memorial, was cancelled, the event organizers received a higher-than-anticipated interest number of entries. As a result, the competition was extended one day to begin on Thursday, October 7, rather than the original Friday, October 8 start date.

Entries 
The International Skating Union published the list of entries on September 14, 2021.

Changes to preliminary assignments

Records 

The following new ISU best scores were set during this competition:

Results

Men

Women

Pairs

Ice dance

References

External links 
 Finlandia Trophy at the International Skating Union
 
 Results

Finlandia Trophy
Finlandia Trophy
Finlandia Trophy
Finlandia Trophy